Shingle Run is a tributary of Huntington Creek in Luzerne County, Pennsylvania, in the United States. The stream is considered to be Class A Wild Trout Waters for its entire length. Additionally, it is listed in the Luzerne County Natural Areas Inventory. Various species of butterfly inhabit the stream's vicinity. Trees in the area include hemlocks and yellow birches. The stream is small, but nevertheless is perennial.

Course
Shingle Run begins in a valley just south of Pennsylvania Route 118 in Ross Township. It flows south-southeast for several tenths of a mile. The stream then turns nearly due south for more than a mile. Its valley becomes progressively deeper. At the southern edge of its valley, the stream reaches its confluence with Huntington Creek.

Tribtuaries
Shingle Run has no tributaries, named or unnamed.

Hydrology and geography
The concentration of alkalinity in Shingle Run is 12 milligrams per liter. The stream is a small feeder tributary of Huntington Creek. However, it has a perennial flow.

Watershed
The stream's watershed is part of the Lower North Branch Susquehanna River drainage basin.

Shingle Run is entirely within the United States Geological Survey quadrangle of Sweet Valley. A total of 92 percent of the stream's length is on open and public lands. The remaining 8 percent of its length is on private lands that are open to the public. Much of the stream is owned by the Pennsylvania Game Commission and is in Pennsylvania State Game Lands Number 206.

History
Shingle Run was entered into the Geographic Names Information System on August 2, 1979. Its identifier in the Geographic Names Information System is 1187540. Shingle Run has had its name since at least 1958, when it was on a map created by the Pennsylvania Fish Commission.

Shingle Run is listed on the Luzerne County Natural Areas Inventory, having been added to it in 2006. Its priority rank is 4 on a scale of 1 to 5, with 1 being the most important.

Biology
Shingle Run is considered by the Pennsylvania Fish and Boat Commission to be Class A Wild Trout Waters from its headwaters to its mouth. The stream is one of six direct tributaries of Huntington Creek to be designated as Class A Wild Trout Waters. The others are Mitchler Run, Arnold Creek, Lick Branch, Phillips Creek, and part of Kitchen Creek. It is inhabited by brook trout.

A number of butterfly species inhabit the vicinity of Shingle Run. These include the Aphrodite fritillary, the Atlantis fritillary, and the northern pearly-eye. Thick forests of pole-sized trees such as hemlock and yellow birch occur along the stream.

See also
Arnold Creek (Huntington Creek), next tributary of Huntington Creek going downstream
Laurel Run (Huntington Creek), next tributary of Huntington Creek going upstream
List of tributaries of Fishing Creek (North Branch Susquehanna River)
List of rivers of Pennsylvania

References

Rivers of Luzerne County, Pennsylvania
Tributaries of Fishing Creek (North Branch Susquehanna River)
Rivers of Pennsylvania